Onguday (Oñdoy) is a rural locality (a selo) and the administrative center of Ongudaysky District in the Altai Republic, Russia, located on the Ursul River,  from Gorno-Altaysk, the capital of the republic. As of the 2010 Census, its population was 5,655, consisting mainly of the Altai people and Russians.

Etymology
Local name Ongdoy (from mongolian onge — "cave, cavity", doy — possession affix;literally — "having cave, cavities"

History
It was founded in 1626. In 1856-1857, the camp-settlement of the Altai spiritual mission of the Russian Orthodox Church was founded. In 1860, the first school was opened, for which a building was built in 1881. In 1879, the Assumption Church was built and consecrated in 1881. In 1908 the Church of St. Innocent of Irkutsk was built. In 1910, about 800 people lived in the village.

Climate
Onguday has a monsoon-influenced humid continental climate (Köppen climate classification Dwb) with warm, humid summers and severely cold, dry winters.

References

Notes

Sources

Rural localities in Ongudaysky District
Populated places established in 1626
1626 establishments in Russia